Gran Vía Asima is a station of the Palma Metro in Palma on the island of Majorca, Spain.

The underground station, which opened 25 April 2007, is located in Gran Via Asima, from which it gets its name. It is located in the centre of the Son Castelló industrial area.

References

Palma Metro stations
Railway stations in Spain opened in 2007